i54 South Staffordshire is a  UK technology-based business park located at Junction 2 on the M54 Motorway in the West Midlands, on the boundary of South Staffordshire and Wolverhampton.

i54 South Staffordshire is a £50 million joint venture partnership between Staffordshire County Council, City of Wolverhampton Council and South Staffordshire Council. It benefits from Enterprise Zone Status and falls within the Black Country Enterprise Zone.

The site entrance is at Junction 2 of the M54 Motorway, just to the west of the Staffordshire and Worcestershire Canal.  The site is home to several manufacturing companies including MOOG Aerospace, Eurofins Laboratories, International Security Printers (ISP), and the home of the £500 million UK advance engine manufacturing facility of Jaguar Land Rover.

The regeneration project is a joint venture between City of Wolverhampton Council, Staffordshire County Council and South Staffordshire Council.

Project costs and details 
The cost of the project to the  site is estimated to be costing £67 million GBP and was granted crucial planning approvals from two local authorities in September 2006.

In August 2006 contractors to the site started the second major phase of the scheme, a £5 million GBP 12-month programme of infrastructure and reclamation work.

On 3 July 2007 key partners for the project toasted the substantial completion of a £10 million GBP programme of remediation and site preparation works on the i54 site. The site preparation work ran over a 16-month period and has been carried out by Blackwell and supervised by Mouchel Parkman engineering consultancy. During this time, the following was achieved:

 Produced level development plots
 Installation of primary infrastructure including a spine road
 Drainage Systems
 Site fencing
 Creation of new wetlands and ecological habitats

Other statistics include:

 152,000 cubic metres of topsoil has been excavated but retained on site.
 190,000 cubic metres of sub-soil and rock excavated and reused on site.
 1 kilometre spine road constructed
 4.5 kilometres of fencing erected (3 kilometres still to be erected)
 Total of 6,500 cubic metres of ponds and swales created as part of the landscaping

Jaguar Land Rover 

On 25 April 2011, Jaguar Land Rover expressed an interest in the i54 site as a possible location for a new advanced engine plant. On 19 September 2011 Deputy Prime Minister Nick Clegg announced at the engine factory in Solihull the proposals for Jaguar Land Rover's decision to build their new engine plant in South Staffordshire creating around 1400 additional jobs within the company and more within the supply chain which will be created by a £500 million investment by Jaguar Land Rover and £10m by the Government. The new plant in Wolverhampton would join other Midlands-based plants in Solihull and Castle Bromwich as well as the birthplace of the new Evoque in Halewood, Liverpool.

It is understood that Jaguar Land Rover is taking on the investments to meet the demands of high sales in Asia. The new engine plant will be home to the new family of 4-cylinder petrol and diesel engines for the luxury Land Rover brand, originally brought to help boost technology in Tata Motors vehicle range. JLR chief executive Dr Ralf Speth announced that £1.5 billion is to be invested into the company and the new engine plant each year for the next 5 years on product development and the engine range. JLR engines are currently being supplied by Ford Motors

Usage potential 
 Around  of industrial space
  of commercial/retail and leisure.

Construction
Construction started on site in 2011, with MOOG fully operational on site by the start of 2012. The Aerospace company makes flight controls and spent £15 million to move from its current location, to the i54 South Staffordshire development. The company hopes to safeguard 400 jobs with its relocation. Laboratory firm Eurofins also moved into the development and was fully operational by 2012.

On the 16 January 2019, permission was granted for a 60 acre expansion to the i54 Business Park to the west of the existing park towards Pendeford Hall Lane. The new extension will also be accessible from the M54 Junction 2.

Enterprise zone
The i54 South Staffordshire site is the largest of the 19 sites which make up the Black Country Enterprise Zone, which has 5 sites in Wolverhampton and 14 in Darlaston, Walsall. The creation of the zone for the Black Country was announced on 23 March 2011 by Chancellor George Osborne. Enterprise zone status speeds up the process of allowing companies to re-locate to the site and encourages it with tax breaks.

Companies at i54 South Staffordshire
MOOG (2011)
Eurofins (2011)
Jaguar Land Rover (2014)
International Security Printers (ISP) (2014)
ERA (Home Security Company) (2018)
Atlas Copco (2018)

References

Wolverhampton
South Staffordshire District
Business parks of England